César Queijeiro Bono (born October 19, 1950), better known as César Bono, is a Mexican film and television actor and comedian. He is better known for his participation in Mexican sex-comedy films.

Biography
Bono was born in Mexico City, Mexico. He is the son of César Queijeiro, Sr. and of María Rosa Bono.

As a young man, he practiced Tennis and Association Football, the later of which he played at a minor, local league.

Health problems
In his older age, Bono has suffered a series of health setbacks. On March 3, 2022, he was hospitalized at Hospital Español in Mexico City, after suffering a perforated duodenum in his small intestine.

Bono has survived eight brain strokes and one heart attack. As a consequence of his eight strokes, all of which took place during 2018, Bono cannot move the left side of his body.

Career
Bono is a member of a group of actors and actresses (such as Andres Garcia, Rafael Inclan, Alfonso Zayas, Maribel Guardia, Sasha Montenegro, Carmen Salinas and others) who have appeared in a large number of Mexican sexy-comedy (or "Fichera") films and made that film genre an important part of their acting careers.

One of his best known works was as Frankie Rivers, in the television series Vecinos (Neighbors) and also for lending his voice to Mater into Latin Spanish in Cars, Cars 2 and Cars 3. Also, in 1983, he acted in the Mexican-Venezuelan film co-production Secuestro En Acapulco-Canta Chamo, alongside Venezuelan boy band Los Chamos.

Filmography
A partial list of Bono's credits:

Cinema
Mirreyes contra Godínez 2: El retiro (2022) as Vicente
Mirreyes vs Godínez (2019) as Vicente
Cars 3 (2017) (Spanish voice-over) Voice of Mate
Cars 2 (2011) (Spanish voice-over) Voice of Mate
Los Pajarracos (2006) as El Champion
Cars (2006) (Spanish voice-over) Voice of Mate
Entre melón y me lames (2006)
Vecinos (2005)
El dormilón (2000)
El tesoro del Pilar (2000)
Los Verduleros atacan de nuevo (1999)
El regreso de la suburban dorada (1998)
Juan Camaney en Acapulco (1998)
Entre dos fuegos (1998)
Un pájaro escondido (1997)
El tratado me vale... Wilson (1995)
La ley del cholo (1995)
Tres cornudos apaleados (1995)
Todo de todo (1994)
La Negra Tomasa (1993)
El Gandalla (1992)
Los Verduleros 3 (1992)
Dos locos en aprietos (1991)
Pelo gallo (1990)
Para todas tengo (1990)
La toalla del mojado (1990)
Pandilleros asesinos (1990)
Keiko en peligro (1990)
La Taquera picante (1990)
La Corneta de mi General (1989)
Narcosatánicos asesinos (1989)
Tenorio profesional (1989)
La Venganza de Don Herculano (1989)
3 lancheros muy picudos (1989) as Armando
Las calenturas de Juan Camaney (1988)
La lechería de Zacarias (1986)
Más vale pájaro en mano (1985)
Secuestro En Acapulco-Canta Chamo (1983)
D.F./Distrito Federal (1981)

Television
Beach Buggy Show (2012-2015) Voice of B'Zorp
El Chapulin Colorado (1979)

See also
List of Mexicans

References

Living people
1950 births
Mexican male actors
Mexican comedians
People from Mexico City
Comedians from Mexico City